Marciano is both a surname and a given name. It originates from Latin Marcianus or Marcian (Saint Marcians) or  "Martians" or Martianus.  Also from the cult of Roman god Mars.

Notable people with the name include:

Surname:
 David Marciano, American actor
 Elizeu Ferreira Marciano, Brazilian footballer
 Enzo Marciano, Italian conductor, composer, and organist
 Joey Marciano, American baseball player
 Ofir Marciano, Israeli footballer 
 Paul Marciano, Moroccan-American fashion designer, and co-founder of Guess? Inc
 Rob Marciano, American journalist and meteorologist
 Rocky Marciano, Heavyweight boxing champion of the world from 9/23/1952 to 11/30/1956
 Rosario Marciano, Venezuelan classical pianist, musicologist, and teacher
 Saadia Marciano, Israeli social activist and politician, and founder of the Israeli Black Panthers
 William Marciano (born 1947), American theoretical physicist
 Yoram Marciano, Israeli politician

Given name:
 Marciano Bruma, Dutch footballer
 Marciano Cantero, Argentine singer and musician
 Marciano Guzman, Filipino poet, philosopher, and certified public accountant
 Marciano José do Nascimento, Brazilian footballer
 Marciano Saldías, Bolivian footballer
 Marciano Vink, Dutch footballer

Maghrebi Jewish surnames
Italian-language surnames
Sephardic surnames
Spanish-language surnames